Hanns Lothar (born Hans Lothar Neutze; 10 April 1929 – 11 March 1967) was a German film actor. He appeared in 36 films between 1948 and 1966. He was born in Hannover, Germany and died in Hamburg, Germany. He was the father of actress Susanne Lothar. 

Lothar remains perhaps best known to international audiences as Schlemmer, James Cagney's devoted German assistant, in Billy Wilder's comedy One, Two, Three (1961). He died suddenly from renal colic problems at 37 years.

Filmography

References

External links

1929 births
1967 deaths
German male film actors
German male television actors
Deaths from kidney failure
20th-century German male actors